Route 27, or Highway 27, may refer to:

Australia
 Burke Developmental Road (Queensland)
 Zeehan Highway (Tasmania)

Canada
 Alberta Highway 27
 British Columbia Highway 27
 Manitoba Highway 27
 Prince Edward Island Route 27
 Saskatchewan Highway 27

Ontario
 Ontario Highway 27
 York Regional Road 27, formerly Highway 27 in York Region
 Simcoe County Road 27, formerly Highway 27 in Simcoe County

Chile
 Chile Route 27

Costa Rica
 National Route 27

Croatia
 D27 road (Croatia)

Czech Republic
 part of  I/27 Highway; Czech: :cz:Silnice I/27

France
 A27 autoroute
Route nationale 27

Germany
 Bundesautobahn 27
 Bundesstraße 27

Greece
 Motorway 27 (Greece)
 Greek National Road 27

India
  National Highway 27 (India)

Iran
 Road 27

Ireland
 N27 road (Ireland)

Italy
 Autostrada A27

Japan
 Japan National Route 27
 Maizuru-Wakasa Expressway

Korea, South
 Suncheon–Wanju Expressway
 National Route 27

Montenegro
 R-27 regional road (Montenegro)

Netherlands
 A27 motorway (Netherlands)

New Zealand
 New Zealand State Highway 27

Norway
 Norwegian County Road 27

Russia
 M27 highway (Russia)

Spain
 Autovía A-27

Switzerland
 European route E27 (partly also in France and Italy)

United Kingdom
 British A27 (Whiteparish-Pevensey)
 M27 (Cadnam-Portsmouth)

United States
 Interstate 27
 U.S. Route 27
 Alabama State Route 27
 Arkansas Highway 27
 Arkansas Highway 27B
 Arkansas Highway 27N (former)
 California State Route 27
 County Route A27 (California)
 County Route J27 (California)
 County Route S27 (California)
 Connecticut Route 27
 Florida State Road 27
 Georgia State Route 27
 Idaho State Highway 27
 Illinois Route 27 (former)
 Iowa Highway 27
 K-27 (Kansas highway)
 Louisiana Highway 27
 Maine State Route 27
 Maryland Route 27
Maryland Route 27B
Maryland Route 27C
Maryland Route 27D
Maryland Route 27E
 Massachusetts Route 27
 M-27 (Michigan highway)
 Minnesota State Highway 27
 County Road 27 (Hennepin County, Minnesota)
 County Road 27 (Ramsey County, Minnesota)
 County Road 27 (Scott County, Minnesota)
 County Road 27 (Washington County, Minnesota)
 Mississippi Highway 27
 Missouri Route 27
Missouri Route 27 (1922) (former)
 Nebraska Highway 27
 Nebraska Spur 27D
 Nebraska Recreation Road 27B
 Nebraska Recreation Road 27C
 Nevada State Route 27 (former)
 New Hampshire Route 27
 New Jersey Route 27
 County Route 27 (Bergen County, New Jersey)
 County Route 27 (Monmouth County, New Jersey)
 County Route 27 (Ocean County, New Jersey)
 New Mexico State Road 27
 New York State Route 27
 County Route 27 (Allegany County, New York)
 County Route 27 (Cattaraugus County, New York)
 County Route 27 (Clinton County, New York)
 County Route 27 (Columbia County, New York)
 County Route 27 (Dutchess County, New York)
 County Route 27 (Erie County, New York)
 County Route 27 (Greene County, New York)
 County Route 27 (Lewis County, New York)
 County Route 27 (Livingston County, New York)
 County Route 27B (Livingston County, New York)
 County Route 27 (Nassau County, New York)
 County Route 27 (Ontario County, New York)
 County Route 27 (Oswego County, New York)
 County Route 27 (Rensselaer County, New York)
 County Route 27 (Rockland County, New York)
 County Route 27 (Schoharie County, New York)
 County Route 27 (Schuyler County, New York)
 County Route 27 (St. Lawrence County, New York)
 County Route 27B (Suffolk County, New York) (former)
 County Route 27 (Ulster County, New York)
 County Route 27 (Washington County, New York)
 County Route 27 (Westchester County, New York)
 County Route 27 (Wyoming County, New York)
 County Route 27 (Yates County, New York)
 North Carolina Highway 27
 North Dakota Highway 27
 Ohio State Route 27 (1923-1927) (former)
 Oklahoma State Highway 27
 Oregon Route 27
 Pennsylvania Route 27
 South Carolina Highway 27
 South Dakota Highway 27
 Tennessee State Route 27
 Texas State Highway 27
 Farm to Market Road 27
 Texas Park Road 27
 Utah State Route 27
 Virginia State Route 27
 Virginia State Route 27 (1918-1933) (former)
 Virginia State Route 27 (1940–1953) (former)
 Washington State Route 27
 West Virginia Route 27
 Wisconsin Highway 27

Territories
 Guam Highway 27
 Puerto Rico Highway 27

See also
List of highways numbered 27A